This was the first edition of the tournament as a 125K event. Vera Zvonareva was the champion when it was last held as a Tier III event in 2003, but chose not to participate.

Mandy Minella won the title, defeating Polona Hercog in the final, 6–2, 6–3.

Seeds

Draw

Finals

Top half

Bottom half

External Links
 Main Draw
 Qualifying Draw

Bol Open - Women's Singles
Croatian Bol Ladies Open